Bożewo refers to the following places in Poland:

 Bożewo, Płońsk County
 Bożewo, Sierpc County